The Po Basin mixed forests is a temperate broadleaf and mixed forests ecoregion in the basin of the Po River in northern Italy and Switzerland's Ticino canton.

Geography
The Po Basin is bounded on the north and west by the Alps, and on the south by the Apennine Mountains. It opens onto the Adriatic Sea on the east.

Flora

Terrestrial plants
The Po Basin mixed forests consists of remnants of:
1. Mixed deciduous oak/hornbeam forest -
Quercus robur
Quercus cerris
Carpinus betulus
Ulmus minor
Fraxinus ornus

2. Riparian forest, as well as flood-plain vegetation of the Po Basin -
Fraxinus oxycarpa
Salix alba
Alnus glutinosa
Ulmus minor
Populus alba
Populus nigra
Quercus robur

3. Coastal submediterranean forest -
Quercus ilex
Quercus cerris
Olea europaea
Pinus pinea
Carpinus betulus
Fraxinus ornus

Aquatic plants
The freshwater ecosystems (zona umida) have a high level of biodiversity.
Threatened (in Italy) plant species include
Leucojum aestivum
Halocnemum strobilaceum
Nymphaea alba
Bassia hirsuta
Limonium bellidifolium
Utricularia australis
Thelypteris palustris
Salvinia natans
Sagittaria sagittifolia
Plantago cornuti

Fauna
Less-disturbed wetlands which are important breeding areas for many bird species are most significant biodiversity of the ecoregion. Examples are grey heron, purple heron, great egret, little egret, squacco heron, cattle egret, great bittern, little bittern, pygmy cormorant and ferruginous duck.

Conservation
The region is industrialised and has a long history of human pressure (shrinkage of wetlands, invasive species, and unsustainable hunting of waterfowl).

Protected areas
A 2017 assessment found that 3,572 km², or 8%, of the ecoregion is in protected areas. Only 2% of the unprotected area remains in natural habitat. Protected areas include the Euganean Hills Regional Park, Po Delta Regional Parks, and Valli del Mincio Nature Reserve.

External links

References

Ecoregions of Italy
Ecoregions of Switzerland
 
 
Forests of Switzerland
Palearctic ecoregions
Temperate broadleaf and mixed forests